Perigonia manni is a moth of the  family Sphingidae. It is known from Haiti.

References

Perigonia
Moths described in 1935
Taxa named by Benjamin Preston Clark